Bill Cassidy (born 1957) is a U.S. Senator from Louisiana since 2015. Senator Cassidy may also refer to:

George Williams Cassidy (1836–1892), Nevada State Senate
Owen Cassidy (c.1862–1911), New York State Senate
Samuel H. Cassidy (born 1950), Colorado State Senate
Vinton Cassidy (fl. 1970s–1990s), Maine State Senate